Brawley (formerly, Braly) is a city in Imperial County, California, United States within the Imperial Valley.

The population was 24,953 at the 2010 census, up from 22,052 in 2000. Year-round agriculture is an important economic activity in Brawley. The town has a significant cattle and feed industry, and hosts the annual Cattle Call Rodeo. Summer daytime temperatures often exceed .

History
The Imperial Land Company laid out the town in 1902 and named it Braly in honor of J.H. Braly, who owned the land. After Braly refused to permit the use of his name, the name was changed to Brawley. The first post office at Brawley opened in 1903.

Incorporated in 1908, it was a "tent city" of only 100 persons involved in railroads and the earliest introduction of agriculture. It had a population of 11,922 in 1950, but population growth was slow from the 1960s to the early 1990s.

Geography

Brawley is located in the Colorado Desert and Lower Colorado River Valley regions. The city's elevation, like other Imperial Valley towns, is below sea level.

All is land within the city limits, except for the Alamo River and New River that seasonally flow through the city.

Climate

December is the wettest month of the year, while June is the driest.

Demographics

2010
At the 2010 census Brawley had a population of 24,953. The racial makeup of Brawley was 13,570 (54.4%) White, 510 (2.0%) African American, 241 (1.0%) Native American, 349 (1.4%) Asian, 32 (0.1%) Pacific Islander, 9,258 (37.1%) from other races, and 993 (4.0%) from two or more races. Hispanic or Latino of any race were 20,344 persons (81.5%).

The census reported that 24,779 people (99.3% of the population) lived in households, 63 (0.3%) lived in non-institutionalized group quarters, and 111 (0.4%) were institutionalized.

There were 7,623 households, 3,827 (50.2%) had children under the age of 18 living in them, 3,932 (51.6%) were opposite-sex married couples living together, 1,560 (20.5%) had a female householder with no husband present, 543 (7.1%) had a male householder with no wife present.  There were 589 (7.7%) unmarried opposite-sex partnerships, and 23 (0.3%) same-sex married couples or partnerships. 1,346 households (17.7%) were one person and 550 (7.2%) had someone living alone who was 65 or older. The average household size was 3.25.  There were 6,035 families (79.2% of households); the average family size was 3.67.

The age distribution was 8,138 people (32.6%) under the age of 18, 2,670 people (10.7%) aged 18 to 24, 6,065 people (24.3%) aged 25 to 44, 5,572 people (22.3%) aged 45 to 64, and 2,508 people (10.1%) who were 65 or older.  The median age was 30.2 years. For every 100 females, there were 94.3 males.  For every 100 females age 18 and over, there were 90.2 males.

There were 8,231 housing units at an average density of ,of which 7,623 were occupied, 3,970 (52.1%) by the owners and 3,653 (47.9%) by renters.  The homeowner vacancy rate was 2.0%; the rental vacancy rate was 8.0%.  12,950 people (51.9% of the population) lived in owner-occupied housing units and 11,829 people (47.4%) lived in rental housing units.

2000

As of the census of 2000, there were 22,052 people in 6,631 households, including 5,265 families, in the city. The racial makeup of the city was 52.8% White, 2.5% Black or African American, 1.1% Native American, 1.3% Asian, 0.2% Pacific Islander, 37.9% from other races, and 4.3% from two or more races.  73.8% of the population were Hispanic or Latino of any race.

Of the 6,631 households 48.0% had children under the age of 18 living with them, 56.0% were married couples living together, 17.5% had a female householder with no husband present, and 20.6% were non-families. 17.1% of households were one person and 7.1% were one person aged 65 or older. The average household size was 3.3 and the average family size was 3.7.

The age distribution was 34.5% under the age of 18, 9.6% from 18 to 24, 28.2% from 25 to 44, 18.1% from 45 to 64, and 9.6% 65 or older.  The median age was 30 years. For every 100 females, there were 96.9 males.  For every 100 females age 18 and over, there were 92.5 males.

The median household income was $31,277 and the median family income  was $35,514. Males had a median income of $34,617 versus $25,064 for females. The per capita income for the city was $12,881.  About 22.5% of families and 26.6% of the population were below the poverty line, including 34.0% of those under age 18 and 14.1% of those age 65 or over.

82.9% Brawley's residents today are of Mexican and Latino origins ; the town contained White, East Indian, Chinese, Filipino and African American sections in the 20th century.

Economy
Major employers in Brawley include Pioneers Memorial Hospital, and Clinicas de Salud del Pueblo. Spreckels Sugar Company is located outside of Brawley.

Government

Brawley is in the 4th Imperial County Board of Supervisors District and is represented by Ryan Kelley.

Education
High-school age students in both Brawley and neighboring Westmorland use the Brawley Union High School District, of which there is one high school, Brawley Union High School.
Brawley also offers Desert Valley High School (10th, 11th and 12th grades), Renaissance (9th and 10th grade), and Del Rio (10th, 11th and 12th grade) all three high schools.
Brawley is also home to Brawley Christian Academy, a private institution.
Children from kindergarten through eighth grade use the Brawley Elementary School District. There are five schools in the Brawley Elementary School District: Barbara Worth Junior High School (serving 7th and 8th grades), Phil D. Swing Elementary School (serving kindergarten-6th grades), Miguel Hidalgo Elementary School (serving kindergarten-6th grades), J.W. Oakley Elementary School (serving kindergarten-6th grades), and Myron D. Witter Elementary School (serving kindergarten-6th grades).
Brawley is located in the Imperial Community College District of which there is one junior college, Imperial Valley College.
San Diego State University operates a satellite campus in Brawley.

Infrastructure
Brawley maintains its own police and fire departments.

Notable people

The Bella Twins, professional wrestlers
Helen Fabela Chávez, Labor Leader
Alan Fowlkes, former pitcher for San Francisco Giants
Joe Hoover, Major League Baseball shortstop, Detroit Tigers
Al McCandless, United States Representative
Mike Mohamed, NFL linebacker, Houston Texans
Sid Monge, MLB pitcher
Barbara O'Brien, Lieutenant Governor of Colorado
Sergio Romo, MLB relief pitcher 
Don Rowe, MLB pitcher and coach, New York Mets
Howard Rumsey, musician
Rudy Seánez, MLB relief pitcher 
Jim Skipper, NFL running backs coach, Carolina Panthers
Steve Taylor, contemporary Christian singer

References

External links

Brawley Chamber of Commerce

 
Cities in Imperial County, California

Communities in the Lower Colorado River Valley
Imperial Valley
Incorporated cities and towns in California
Populated places in the Colorado Desert
Populated places established in 1908
1908 establishments in California